Michael McGuire is an author and newspaper columnist for The Advertiser in South Australia. In 2016, he won the South Australian Media Award for "Best Coverage of Sport All Media". His novel Never a true word is a political and legal thriller, and will be published by Wakefield Press in 2017.

References 

Year of birth missing (living people)
Living people
Australian male novelists